Chiu Chang-yueh is a Taiwanese politician.

Political career
By 2014, Chiu had taken office as deputy minister of the interior under Chen Wei-zen. Frequently, he was called upon to make public comments on law enforcement and emergency services. Chiu remained deputy interior minister as the Ma Ying-jeou presidential administration was replaced by that of Tsai Ing-wen. Chiu was called before the Legislative Yuan to discuss amendments to the Social Order Maintenance Act permitting penalties to be levied against people who misused the 1-1-0 emergency telephone number, which passed in May 2016. Chiu helped coordinate security for the 2017 Summer Universiade and private events. He also presided over naturalization ceremonies for Mary Paul Watts, O Anuna, and Gian Carlo Michelini. In 2018, Chiu commented on several topics, among them missing aircraft, proposed revisions to building codes, a bill regarding the financial records of private foundations, and proposed legislation on stalking and harassment. In September 2019, Chiu was nominated to fill a seat on the Central Election Commission, for which he was confirmed by the Legislative Yuan in October 2019.

References

Year of birth missing (living people)
Living people
Government ministers of Taiwan